Kuhpayeh  District is a district (bakhsh) in Isfahan County, Isfahan Province, Iran. At the 2006 census, its population was 21,760, in 6,428 families.  The District has three cities: Kuhpayeh, Sejzi, and Tudeshg. The District has four rural districts (dehestan): Jabal Rural District, Sistan Rural District, Tudeshk Rural District, and Zefreh Rural District.

References 

Isfahan County
Districts of Isfahan Province